Mehus is a surname.

Mehus may also refer to:
, a village in Nordland, Norway
Mehus, a village in Sheikhpura district, Bihar, India
Belle Mehus Auditorium, music venue in Bismarck, North Dakota, United States

See also
 Mehu (c. 2300 BC), Sixth Dynasty Egyptian vizier
 Melhus (disambiguation)